Saint Andrew North East is a constituency of Grenada, within the parish of Saint Andrew. Its capital is Conference.

Constituency Ministers

Election results

2022

References 

Constituencies of Grenada